The 2018 Varsity Cup was contested from 29 January to 16 April 2018. The tournament (known as the FNB Varsity Cup for sponsorship reasons) was the eleventh season of the Varsity Cup, an annual inter-university rugby union competition featuring South African universities.

Competition rules and information

There were nine participating universities in the 2018 Varsity Cup. During the round-robin stage of the competition, these teams played each other once over the course of the season, either home or away. Teams received four points for a win and two points for a draw. Bonus points were awarded to teams that scored four or more tries in a game, as well as to teams that lost a match by seven points or less. Teams were ranked by log points, then points difference (points scored less points conceded).

The top four teams qualified for the title play-offs. In the semi-finals, the team that finished first had home advantage against the team that received fourth, while the team that finished second had home advantage against the team that finished third. The winners of these semi-finals played each other in the final, at the home venue of the higher-placed team.

Tries were worth five or seven points, depending on the point where the try-scoring move originated. If the try-scoring move originated in the opponents' half, it would count five points. If the move originated in the try-scoring team's own half, two bonus points were awarded and the try would be worth seven points.

For the 2018 season, the Varsity Cup introduced a Power Play rule; when a team calls for the Power Play, they can nominate two opposition backline players to be removed from the field of play for a period of three minutes.

Teams

The following teams took part in the 2018 Varsity Cup competition:

Standings

The final standings for the 2018 Varsity Cup were:

Matches

The following matches were played in the 2018 Varsity Cup:

Round one

Round two

Round three

Round four

Round five

Round six

Round seven

Round eight

Round nine

Semi-finals

Final

See also

 Varsity Cup
 2018 Varsity Rugby
 2018 Varsity Shield

References

External links
 

2018
2018 in South African rugby union
2018 rugby union tournaments for clubs